Marvel Presents was an American comic book anthology series published by Marvel Comics.  Twelve issues were published from October 1975 to August 1977.

Publication history

Bloodstone
Marvel Presents began publication with an October 1975 cover date. The first two issues featured Ulysses Bloodstone, a character created by Len Wein, Marv Wolfman, and John Warner for the Where Monsters Dwell series. Mike Vosburg was the artist assigned to the first installment, and then Pat Boyette was to draw the rest of the series. Where Monsters Dwell was cancelled and "Bloodstone" was moved to Marvel Presents. The first two chapters were finished and were printed in issue #1. Due to the publishing delays, Boyette was unavailable for the second issue, which was drawn by Sonny Trinidad instead.

Guardians of the Galaxy
Marvel Presents is notable for giving the original Guardians of the Galaxy their first regular series, from issues #3-12, by Steve Gerber and Al Milgrom.Roger Stern replaced Gerber as writer with issue #10.  Issue #7 (Nov. 1976) depicted an obvious sex act in a Comics Code-approved comic book, between Vance Astro and Nikki. It presumably made it past the Code because Nikki was outside her physical body and Vance was in the mind of the Topographical Man, a humanoid heavenly body. The series was cancelled with issue #12 (August 1977) due to low sales.

The issues

Collected editions
 Marvel Firsts: The 1970s Vol. 3 includes Marvel Presents #1 and #3, 380 pages, June 2012, 
 Guardians of the Galaxy: The Power of Starhawk includes Marvel Presents #3–12, 192 pages, July 2009, 
 Guardians of the Galaxy: Tomorrow's Avengers includes Marvel Presents #3–12, 368 pages, January 2013,

References

External links 
 
 Marvel Presents at the Unofficial Handbook of Marvel Comics Creators
 

1975 comics debuts
1977 comics endings
Comics anthologies
Comics by Roger Stern
Comics by Steve Gerber
Defunct American comics
Marvel Comics titles
Post-apocalyptic comics
Science fiction comics